Dokhtar-i-Noshirwan, also Nigar, is an archaeological site in the Ḵolm valley in northern Afghanistan. It is located 100 kilometers north of Bamiyan and has the largest non-Buddhist mural in Afghanistan. 

The mural represent a local ruler, possibly Hephthalite, in an attitude similar to that of Khosrau II on one of his silver plates: seated frontally with legs spread out and his hands on a large swords standing between his knees. The crown is formed by the head of a beast, framed by two wings, similar to a design known from the coins of Shahi Tegin.

The artists of Dokhtar i-Noshirwan for may have come from Bamiyan or Kakrak.

References

Archaeological sites in Afghanistan